Eucosmophora chrysocosma is a moth of the family Gracillariidae. It is known from Guyana.

The length of the forewings is 3.4–4 mm for males and 3.7–5 mm for females.

The larvae probably feed on a Sapotaceae species and probably mine the leaves of their host plant.

References

Acrocercopinae
Moths described in 1915